Heatwave's Greatest Hits is a greatest hits album by Heatwave released by Epic Records in 1984.  It features all of their biggest hits from all of their albums, with the lone exception of the Hot Property album, which all of its singles were omitted.

Track listing

References

External links
Heatwave's Greatest Hits on Discogs

Heatwave (band) albums
Epic Records compilation albums
1984 compilation albums